Federal Convention, a gathering to consider reforming a Frame of Government, may refer to any convention called under the authority of a central government; such as:
Constitutional Convention (United States) (1787), the convention where the United States Constitution was written, also called the Philadelphia Convention
Convention to propose amendments to the United States Constitution, method of proposing amendment(s) under Article Five of the United States Constitution
Constitutional conventions called by Acts of the United States Congress under Article Four of the United States Constitution for the admission of new states from federal territories
Constitutional conventions mandated by the Reconstruction Acts after the American Civil War
Second Constitutional Convention of the United States, a proposal for reforming the United States Federal government by rewriting its Constitution.
Federal Convention (German Confederation), the legislative body of the German Confederation
Federal Convention (Germany), the body that elects the President of Germany
Federal Convention of Namibia, a former political party in Namibia
National Democratic and Federal Convention, a political party in Chad
Conventions held preliminary to the Federation of Australia#Early constitutional conventions